Karl Owen Thomas (born November 1, 1963) is a United States Navy vice admiral who serves as the 53rd commander of the United States Seventh Fleet since July 8, 2021. He previously served as Assistant Deputy Chief of Naval Operations for Operations, Plans, and Strategy and prior to that as the commander of Carrier Strike Group 5. In April 2021, he was nominated for promotion to vice admiral and assignment to relieve Vice Admiral William R. Merz as commander of the United States Seventh Fleet. Born in Fairfax, Virginia, and raised in Northern Virginia, Thomas earned a bachelor's degree in management systems from the Rensselaer Polytechnic Institute in 1986. He later received a Master of Science degree in information technology from the Naval Postgraduate School.

In March 2023, Thomas was assigned as the deputy chief of naval operations for information warfare and director of naval intelligence.

Awards and decorations

References

|-

1963 births
Living people
People from Fairfax, Virginia
Rensselaer Polytechnic Institute alumni
United States Naval Flight Officers
Naval Postgraduate School alumni
United States Navy admirals